The Case of the Frightened Lady is a 1940 British, black-and-white, crime, drama, mystery thriller, directed by George King and starring Marius Goring as Lord Lebanon, Helen Haye as Lady Lebanon, Penelope Dudley Ward as Isla Crane, George Merritt (actor) as Detective Inspector Tanner, Ronald Shiner as Detective Sergeant Totty and Felix Aylmer as Dr Amersham. It was produced by Pennant Picture Productions and presented by British Lion Film Corporation. The film is based on the 1931 play by Edgar Wallace.

This production was the second time that Wallace’s play had been adapted for the cinema. The first production in 1932 was directed by T. Hayes Hunter and starred Emlyn Williams. The BBC also produced two television versions; the first in 1938 and the second in 1983 which starred Warren Clarke and Virginia McKenna.

In 2008, the film was released on DVD by Odeon Entertainment as part of their 'Best of British' collection. Prior to this release, the film had not been seen in public since its original release.

Plot
The story is a thriller that revolves around the Lebanon family who live at Mark’s Priory. Lady Lebanon (Helen Haye) tells her son, William, Lord Lebanon (Marius Goring) that he must marry his cousin Isla Crane (Penelope Dudley Ward) to continue the family line. However, William has no intention of marrying Isla and matters are made more complicated due to Isla falling in love with an architect, Richard Ferraby (Patrick Barr), who has come to Mark’s Priory to draw up renovation plans. At the same time the strange behaviour of two footmen and the family physician (Felix Aylmer) add to the mystery surrounding the family. Eventually rumour and speculation lead to a murderous conclusion.

Cast
'Willie', Lord Lebanon - Marius Goring
Isla Crane - Penelope Dudley Ward
Dowager Lady Lebanon - Helen Haye
Dr Lester Charles Amersham - Felix Aylmer
Detective Inspector William Tanner - George Merritt
Sergeant Totty - Ronald Shiner
Richard Ferraby - Patrick Barr
Gilder - Roy Emerton
Brooks - George Hayes
Studd, The Chauffeur - John Warwick
Jackson, the Maid - Elizabeth Scott
Jim Tilling, The Gamekeeper - Torin Thatcher
Mrs Tilling - Mavis Clair
Vicar - Roddy Hughes

Critical reception

The New York Times wrote, "the sort of thing Edgar Wallace could make intriguing on paper—or, on the stage, as he did in telling of the horrendous doings at Mark's Priory in Criminal at Large about ten years ago. But the old shocker has lost most of its punch...There are several reasons why Frightened Lady doesn't come off as it should. One is that Director George King has not evidenced any regard for suspense, the other is that the performances, on the whole, are uninspired. But perhaps the real reason is that the story itself is outmoded for cinematic treatment"; while Britmovie called it "a tightly written murder mystery...probably one of the best scored films of the 1940s, with the piano dirges being played throughout the movie, “The Case of the Frightened Lady” is a fast moving story... (it) remains a classic for those who enjoy this genre of film"; and Vérité noted "a fun and feisty thriller that unlike so many modern films, doesn't outstay its welcome."

References

External links
 
 
 

1940 films
1940 crime drama films
1940 mystery films
1940s thriller films
British black-and-white films
Films based on works by Edgar Wallace
Films directed by George King
British crime drama films
British mystery films
British thriller films
Remakes of British films
Films scored by Jack Beaver
1940s English-language films
1940s British films